Etamivan (INN, or ethamivan (USAN); trade names Analepticon, Emivan, and Vandid) is a respiratory stimulant drug related to nikethamide. It was mainly used in the treatment of barbiturate overdose and chronic obstructive pulmonary disease, but has now largely fallen into disuse.

Adverse effects which are common to the respiratory stimulant class include sneezing, coughing, and laryngospasm when infused too rapidly. More serious adverse events include muscle twitching, tremors, and convulsions. The dose to treat barbiturate intoxication or carbon dioxide narcosis in adults ranges from 0.5 mg/kg to 5.0 mg/kg, infused intravenously over several minutes. Epilepsy and the use of monoamine oxidase inhibitors or other adrenergic drugs are contraindications.

References

Stimulants
Respiratory agents
Phenols
Benzamides
Phenol ethers